María Alejandra Herrera Andreucci (Santiago, May 14, 1971) is a Chilean actress known mainly for starring in the telenovelas Amor a domicilio, Adrenalina and Marparaíso on Canal 13, and in La Nany on Mega. 

She graduated from the School of Theater of the University of Chile in 1994, she debuted in teleseries the following year in Amor a domicilio on Channel 13. 

She starred in the Chilean adaptations of the series La Nany on Mega and Ana y los Siete on Chilevisión.

Her debut in the cinema was with the film Los Turistas All Inclusive in 2020.

In September 2021, she made her candidacy official for Deputy of District 10 for the Communes: La Granja, Macul, Ñuñoa, Providencia, San Joaquín and Santiago of the United Central Party of Chile

Filmography

Telenovelas

TV Series

References 

1971 births
Chilean telenovela actresses
Chilean television actresses
Living people
People from Santiago